Hallmark Channel is an American cable television network owned by Hallmark Media, a subsidiary of Hallmark Cards. The channel broadcasts family-oriented general entertainment programming, including television series and made-for-TV movies. Much of the latter consists of romance films and romantic comedies, often with specific seasons or holidays as a theme.

The channel has its origins in the religious broadcasters American Christian Television System (ACTS) and the Vision Interfaith Satellite Network (VISN); the two services timeshared on a single satellite signal branded as VISN-ACTS, which later rebranded as The Faith & Values Channel in 1993. In 1996, the channel rebranded as Odyssey Network following the acquisition of a 49% stake by Liberty Media, and began to pivot towards a secular, family-oriented format. Hallmark Entertainment and The Jim Henson Company acquired stakes in the channel in 1998, and further reduced the amount of religious programming carried by Odyssey. In 2001, after a corporate reorganization to form Crown Media Holdings, Odyssey rebranded as Hallmark Channel.

Despite largely being an apolitical brand, Hallmark Channel has garnered a following among politically conservative viewers in suburban and rural areas who, according to Manhattan Institute for Policy Research's Steven Malanga in a Los Angeles Times op-ed, feel the network and its original programming feed their desire to "express traditional family values and also to steer away from political themes and stories that denigrate religion." Their biggest conservative-leaning competitors in terms of entertainment programming are INSP, FETV, and GAC Family (which was established by Hallmark Channel's former CEO Bill Abbott).  Much of the filming for Hallmark Channel's most popular shows is done in Canada, with Canadian stars, scenery and talent.

 Hallmark Channel was available to approximately 85,439,000 pay television households (73.4% of households with television) in the United States.

History

The Hallmark Channel traces its history to the launch of two separate religious cable channels, the American Christian Television System (ACTS) and the Vision Interfaith Satellite Network (VISN). The two networks began alternating time on a shared transponder slot on the Galaxy III satellite in 1992. Under the original timeshare agreement, the network was branded as VISN/ACTS. Each network was provided time for its programming blocks, and would use their own logos.

VISN launched on July 1, 1988, and was founded by the National Interfaith Cable Coalition, in cooperation with several cable providers. The coalition's membership consisted of 65 different religious groups. It aired for about 16 hours a day and ran religious programs from mainline Protestant denominations such as the United Methodist Church, the Evangelical Lutheran Church in America and the United Church of Christ. In addition, Roman Catholic, The Church of Jesus Christ of Latter-day Saints, Jewish, and Islamic faiths also provided some programming. VISN aired during the morning and evening hours. ACTS commenced operations in 1984, and was owned by the Southern Baptist Convention. It aired programming from evangelical and fundamentalist non-charismatic Christian groups such as the SBC, the Christian Reformed Church, and the Association of Regular Baptist Churches, as well as well-known evangelists such as Jerry Falwell, Charles Stanley and D. James Kennedy. Both channels aired several hours a week of religious children's programs, some of which overlapped, including Sunshine Factory, Joy Junction, Davey and Goliath, and Jot.

In 1993, VISN-ACTS was relaunched as the Faith & Values Channel; it began adding a few secular programs during this time, including news, information, and lifestyle programming

Odyssey Network
In 1995, cable conglomerate Tele-Communications Inc.'s Liberty Media acquired a 49% ownership stake in the Faith & Values Channel, and took over operational control of the network. It added more secular programming to the network and reduced religious programming to about 10 hours a day. In 1996, the network was rebranded as the Odyssey Network (although on-air promotions often referred to the network simply as "Odyssey"), and launched a website, Odysseyfamily.com, which was used to provide program listings for the network.

In 1997, channel CEO Gary Hill died. The Teaching of Christ, The Daily Mass and A Biblical Portrait of Marriage were regular religious programs on the channel. Wholesome off-network series on the channel were Brooklyn Bridge and Trapper John, M.D., as well as the Davey and Goliath claymation kids' show. The channel produced shows under the Odyssey Productions name. The channel had a variety show hosted by gospel singer CeCe Winans called CeCe's Place and launched Landmarks of Faith on July 1, 1998.

Hallmark Entertainment and The Jim Henson Company bought significant stakes, paid partly through programming commitments, in Odyssey in late 1998. Liberty had convinced Hallmark not to launch its own domestic channel, given difficulty getting carriage. National Interfaith Cable Coalition and Hallmark-Henson would have equal shares while Liberty would increase its stake, while the three groups would share control of the board. Hallmark and Henson would have say over chief executive selection. While adding Henson's and Hallmark's libraries, the channel could not make major programming format changes, so cable systems could not drop them. Hallmark hired former Fox Kids Network worldwide vice-chairman Margaret Loesch that year to overhaul Odyssey into a family channel.

Under the new ownership structure, Odyssey underwent a major programming revamp on April 4, 1999; the revamp decreased the amount of religious programs on the network down to an average of four hours a day, although more hours were religious on the weekend. The channel began to focus more on family-targeted entertainment programming, including classic sitcoms and variety series (such as ALF and The Muppet Show), children's programs (such as The Archie Show, Fraggle Rock, and Zoobilee Zoo), and family-oriented films and miniseries (such as the cable broadcast premiere of Hallmark and Henson's 1996 adaptation of Gulliver's Travels). The afternoon block Leonard Maltin Presents featured films from the RHI Entertainment-owned Hal Roach Studios library, while Wednesday nights featured classic Hallmark Hall of Fame productions.

Loesch explained that the three owners shared a commitment to "quality programming" and "raising the bar on television", and that the channel was being programmed in a direction reminiscent of television in the 1950s and 1960s, where broadcasters "really had quite broad fare, but you never had to ask anyone to leave the room, like your children".

Hallmark Channel
In 2000, Odyssey's ownership group was re-organized as Crown Media Holdings, with Hallmark, Chase Equity Associates, Liberty Media, and the National Interfaith Cable Coalition transferring their shares in Odyssey to the company. There were plans for the company to go public; Hallmark received all of Crown Media's class B shares, which were worth ten votes each, thus giving it control of Crown Media. After The Jim Henson Company was sold to German company EM.TV & Merchandising in February 2000, it sold its remaining stake in Odyssey the following month in exchange for 8% of Crown Media's stock.

On August 5, 2001, the channel underwent yet another rebranding, relaunching as the Hallmark Channel. After agreeing to distribute a religious digital cable network among other items to lift restrictions on the Odyssey Channel to effect the rebranding with plans to quickly add original programming. The Infinite Worlds of H.G. Wells mini-series was the first programming under the rebranding. New original programming for the year included the third installment of its Sherlock Holmes film series and five other films, two mini-series and three scripted series, one coming from The Jim Henson Company. In April 2001, Crown Media purchased 700 titles from the film library Hallmark Entertainment Distribution, a wholly owned subsidiary of Hallmark Entertainment, for its cable channels and Crown Interactive. The channel began a Sunday night mystery movie wheel series called Mystery Movie in 2005.

In 2002, the Hallmark Channel premiered a weekday morning talk show, New Morning. A Sunday morning version, hosted by Naomi Judd, titled Naomi's New Morning, debuted in 2005 and lasted two years before being pulled from the schedule in early 2007.

Hallmark Channels in international markets were sold for about $242 million in 2005 to Sparrowhawk Media, a private equity group backed by Providence Equity Partners and 3i. The channel in 2005 had its highest-rated year with 34% increase in viewers and ranked seventh in growth. 2005's highest-rated ad-supported basic cable movie with a 3.6 household rating was "Meet the Santas" on Hallmark.

In 2006, the channel acquired a license for 35 Warner Bros. features including "Troy" (2007) and "March of the Penguins" (2005), costing in the multimillion-dollar range. The channel set a new high rating (4.2 household) for an original movie, The Christmas Card, in 2006.

With the expiration of RHI Entertainment's exclusive contract with Hallmark Channel, Larry Levinson Productions became the channel's sole producer. In 2007, additional producers were added as suppliers as the channel increased the number of original films by 50% from 20 in 2007 to 30 in 2008.

In January 2008, the Hillary Clinton presidential campaign purchased an hour of Hallmark Channel's primetime slots under a paid programming arrangement to run a town hall special promoting Clinton's campaign for President of the United States on February 4, the day before the multi-state "Super Tuesday" primaries. The wheel series "Mystery Movie" was discontinued in 2008 as the channel was doing better with lighter romances.

With a change in company president in May 2009, the new president planned to move the channel away from dependence on the Western to more light hearted fare to de-age their viewers without alienating their current viewers and match the Hallmark brand more. In mid-June 2009, the network announced it would sell individual ad breaks featuring a single advertiser. The so-called "Fast Breaks" are prefaced with short bumpers announcing that the program streaming will return after a 30-second break. The cost of such standalone spots is about double that of a regular 30-second commercial on the channel. Hallmark Channel signed insurance company Mutual of Omaha as the first buyer.

In late 2009, The National Tree film kicked off its first annual "Countdown to Christmas" seasonal programming. Hallmark characters, Hoops & Yoyo, hosted Friday "Movie Night" during the Countdown.

2010 saw the channel make a push into lifestyle programming. A January 2010 multi-year deal with Martha Stewart Living Omnimedia (MSLO) brought The Martha Stewart Show from syndication to Hallmark in September. Stewart would also produce four prime-time one hour specials for the channel. Hallmark was looking to be a holiday programming destination. On March 26, 2010, a new home and lifestyle block during weekday daytime of Martha Stewart shows started airing on the channel for seven hours. A shorter Stewart block would also air on the weekends. After one month on air with lackluster ratings, the block was reduced to five hours. In January 2012, the channel canceled The Martha Stewart Show given the show's cost effective with the end of the season in May with reruns through the summer months, but intend to retain a couple of MSLO shows.

Hallmark Channel and co-owned film service Hallmark Movie Channel were dropped by AT&T U-verse on September 1, 2010, due to a carriage dispute resulting from a proposed increase in retransmission consent payments that U-verse considered to be disproportionate with the lower audience viewership for the channels at the time. As of July 23, 2015, both channels returned to U-verse.

In 2011, Hallmark started its animal-featuring shows with Hero Dog Awards. Its 2014 Kitten Bowl, up against the Super Bowl, got 1 million viewers. Jingle, the husky pup (a Hallmark merchandising character), was featured in an animated Christmas special, Jingle All the Way, on November 25, 2011. In 2012, "Christmas in July" programming was launched over a weekend to promote Hallmark Cards' new holiday ornaments debut and became an annual event.

In the fourth quarter of 2012, Hallmark Channel did a makeover of its daytime schedule. The channel launched a Marie! talk show starring Marie Osmond, and Home & Family, while running repeats of three MSLO programs. Two TV pilot movies, Cedar Cove and When Calls the Heart, both book adaptations, were also shown. Home & Family was previously on The Family Channel. Cedar Cove was ordered to a series, the channel's first prime time original series, in October 2012 even before its January 2013 movie premiere. and When Calls the Heart was also picked up as a series. However, Marie! was canceled after its first season.

With the 2011–2012 season, ABC picked up Hallmark Hall of Fame with the Hallmark Channel showing each episode a week later. The Hall of Fame series was moved from ABC to Hallmark with the 2014–2015 season and would air as many as four times a year. The first episode to debut on Hallmark Channel was One Christmas Eve, starring Anne Heche. On the cable channel, four original movies at most would air as a part of the Hall of Fame with multiple encores. The HHOF library would also be available.

On March 15, 2013, the channel introduced a new family-oriented Friday night movie block, Walden Family Theater, in partnership with Walden Media and others. In an unusual deal in 2013, CBS syndicated The Good Wife to Hallmark, two streaming services and TV stations, who got the shows on weekends. While the show met its good story-telling goal with the series showing four hours in prime time, the channel pulled the show after many months as it did not fit in other ways.

Two new series, Good Witch and Sign, Sealed, Delivered, were picked up for the 2014–2015 season. Sign comes from Martha Williamson, while the Good Witch was transitioning from a movie series. In February 2015, the channel aired its first "Countdown to Valentine's" programming event based on its success with "Countdown to Christmas" accounting for 30% of annual ad revenue.

In April 2014, the channel launched a TV Everywhere video on-demand service, "Hallmark Channel Everywhere", which offers a streaming selection of Hallmark Channel films and series for subscribers on participating television providers. At some point before July 2021, the name of the app was changed to "Hallmark TV".

In 2015, Mariah Carey directed and starred in a Christmas movie for Hallmark. She also hosted Mariah Carey's Merriest Christmas, which was the channel's most-viewed show. Thus in May 2016, Carey signed a three-telefilm deal for her to develop, executive-produce, direct, costar, and write an original song for three movies with one for "Countdown to Valentine's Day".

The channel's first "Winterfest" seasonal programming was in January 2016. At its March 2016 upfronts, Hallmark Channel executives revealed that they planned to divide their programming into themed seasons year-round, to build upon the success of Countdown to Christmas and other franchises.

On October 20, 2016, Hallmark Channel and the Hallmark Movies & Mysteries channel were added to the Sling TV service. On November 15, 2017, PlayStation Vue added Hallmark Channel, Hallmark Movies & Mysteries, and Hallmark Drama to its lineup.

In October 2017, Hallmark Channel launched a new, over-the-top subscription service known as Hallmark Movies Now, which features new and existing original content from the network. In October 2018, the three Hallmark linear channels were added to streaming service Philo. With SiriusXM, Crown Media launched the Hallmark Channel Radio channel on November 1, 2018, as 24/7 holiday music format as a part of the network's "Countdown to Christmas" campaign. Network talent would introduce the music and include behind the scenes segments from its holiday movies.

In November 2017, the channel beat all four major broadcast networks in the ratings one night with its Hallmark Hall of Fame movie, The Christmas Train. In March 2019, Hallmark announced it had dropped Lori Loughlin from future company projects due to her role in the 2019 college admissions bribery scandal.

In December 2019, the channel stopped airing advertisements for the online wedding registry Zola.com that included two brides kissing each other, because of complaints that it was lesbians kissing and promoted same-sex marriages. A main complainant was One Million Moms, a division of the socially conservative American Family Association, which has been described as an anti-LGBTQ hate group by the Southern Poverty Law Center. Similar advertisements with heterosexual couples kissing were not pulled. As a result, social media users called for a boycott of the channel, while competitors like Netflix and the Disney-owned Freeform cable channel responded by touting their LGBTQ inclusivity. On December 15, Hallmark reversed its decision and said it would reinstate the advertisements and work with GLAAD, an LGBTQ media monitoring organization, to create more inclusive programming.  The series finale of Good Witch, which aired in July 2021, featured the first lesbian kiss in a Hallmark production.

Programming

Hallmark Channel's programming consists of classic and some recent/original television series, and original made-for-TV movies. It also airs the Hallmark Hall of Fame anthology series.

Original programs broadcast on the network include the daytime talk show Home & Family (which originated on Freeform when it was known as The Family Channel, in April 1996) and When Calls the Heart (which is based on the novels by Janette Oke). The network's original programming initially consisted mainly of lifestyle programs and made-for-TV movies; Hallmark Channel debuted its first prime time original scripted series in July 2013, with the premiere of Cedar Cove (which is based on the novels by Debbie Macomber).

Original movies

The network's made-for-TV movies are characterized as family-friendly and inspirational, ranging from holiday-themed films to westerns. In the early stages of the channel's development, Hallmark Channel had a steady one-movie-a-month, or 12-a-year, production schedule with the films mainly being produced by RHI Entertainment. However, in 2008, Crown Media had ramped up its production schedule to approximately 30 movies a year and opened up two other production companies, though RHI still produces some movies for Hallmark Channel. The network premiered 35 original movies during the period from 2009 to 2010.

Hallmark original movies were budgeted at $2.2 million in 2007. Hallmark does not pay the full cost of films, thus the production company deficit-financed them.

Series
 Hallmark Hall of Fame: Originally only an encore or library home for the Hallmark Hall of Fame anthology film series, the series moved its original showings to the channel in 2014.
 Mystery Movie (also Hallmark Channel Mystery Wheel): The channel began a Sunday night mystery movie wheel series called Mystery Movie in 2004. This wheel series consisted of four individual movie series of four films that would also be later shown on Hallmark Movie Channel. Two of the film series were Mystery Woman and Jane Doe. A successor series, Original Mystery Wheel, was established in 2015 on the Hallmark Movies & Mysteries channel.
 Walden Family Theater (2013) On March 15, 2013, the channel started its family friendly Friday night movie series, Walden Family Theater in partnership with Walden Media, Arc Entertainment, Procter & Gamble and Walmart. P&G and Walmart were sponsoring partners with Walmart selling the movies DVD in store the Tuesday after airing, while Arc and Walden were producing partners. The first movie was the world premiere of Return to Nim's Island, one of six new films produced for the series. Space Warriors was shown later in the premier season, with additional films drawn from Hallmark's library of films. The series' second season was launched on September 6, 2013, with the premiere of the film, Dear Dumb Diary based upon the Scholastic book, with the Civil Rights era drama The Watsons Go to Birmingham premiering next.

Seasonal programming
Hallmark Channel is known for scheduling themed programming around major holidays such as Christmas, Mother's Day, and Valentine's Day—including new original movies relevant to said holiday. With the introduction of its "Countdown to Christmas" branding in 2009, the channel gradually expanded the number of seasonal programming events it holds. By 2016, the network had divided its schedule into themed "seasons" year-round, with original programming aligned with these themes. Crown Media's then-CEO Bill Abbott explained that this strategy allowed the network to be positioned as "a year-round destination for celebrations", which need not depend on a single series or franchise to bolster its viewership. This programming strategy also creates synergies with Hallmark Cards.
 "New Year New Movies!" is broadcast in January; it features movies with a winter theme, but not necessarily tied to the Christmas and holiday season (as with Countdown to Christmas). The event was previously known as "Winterfest" from 2016 to 2020.
 "Loveuary", formerly "Countdown To Valentine's Day" (2015–2019) and "Love Ever After" (2020–2021), is broadcast in February. In 2015, the event was 15 days long with four original movie premieres.
 "Spring into Love", formerly "Spring Fling" and "Spring Fever", is broadcast in March and April.
 "Countdown to Summer" was a one time event with 5 movies in May 2020.
 "Summer Nights" (2016–present) is broadcast June through August. In 2017, Summer Nights movies were only shown in August. In 2018 and 2019, Summer Nights movies were shown in July and August. In 2020, there were only three Summer Nights movies in August to go along with the five Countdown to Summer movies in May. In 2021, Summer Nights movies were split up into 2 parts, with the first part being all in June, then taking over a month break, with the second part starting the last week of July, going through all of August, and ending the first week of September.
 "June Weddings" (2017–2019) was broadcast in June. It has been on hiatus on Hallmark Channel starting in 2020.
 "Fall Harvest"  (2015–present) airs during September and most of October, primarily airing autumn-themed movies (sometimes relating to Halloween). In 2016 and 2019, Fall Harvest movies only aired in October. 
 "Five Nights Stuffed Full of Original Holiday Movies" (2015–present), which airs near Thanksgiving.

Countdown to Christmas
From the last weekend in October until January 1, Hallmark Channel runs a seasonal block called Countdown to Christmas, featuring a mix of holiday movies, specials and holiday-themed original programming. The block is branded as Countdown to New Years from December 26 until January 1 and culminates with the channel's broadcast of the Tournament of Roses Parade.

Countdown to Christmas started in 2009, while the channel's first holiday original movie was aired in 2000. Hallmark characters, Hoops & Yoyo, hosted Friday "Movie Night", starting in 2009 during the Countdown. Countdown had 12 original movies in 2013 and 21 in 2016. Actresses frequently featured in the channel's Christmas films (dubbed the "Queens of Christmas") include Rachel Boston, Candace Cameron Bure (who does other work for Hallmark Channel, mainly as Aurora Teagarden), Lacey Chabert, Erin Krakow, Kellie Martin, Danica McKellar, Autumn Reeser and Alicia Witt. Hallmark's "Christmas TV ratings system" has designations like "F for Family" and "J for Joy".

Since 2012, the network has held a Christmas in July event with airings of past Hallmark Channel Christmas movies, which is used to promote Hallmark Cards' collectibles for the upcoming season. In 2013, the event included holiday tips from the cast of Home & Family. In 2014, the event added a theatrical movie premiere. By 2015, the event included one new original movie.

In 2014, the Hallmark Channel and Hallmark Cards collaborated for the first time on a movie, Northpole, which was shown during Countdown to Christmas.
During the 2017 holiday season, the Hallmark Channel premiered 33 original Christmas holiday films, up from a total of 28 holiday movies in 2016. As of 2017, Hallmark had a total of 136 Christmas holiday-themed movies in their original library of films.

For 2018, a satellite radio companion to the event was carried on Sirius XM—"Hallmark Channel Radio"—which carried Christmas music hosted by Hallmark Channel talent (such as Holly Robinson Peete and Lacey Chabert), and behind-the-scenes features relating to Countdown to Christmas programming. In honor of the franchise's 10th anniversary, Countdown to Christmas movies aired on Friday nights throughout 2019, and a "Hallmark Channel Christmas Con" was held in Edison, New Jersey in November 2019, featuring appearances by Hallmark Channel talent.

Animal special franchise
With the success of the Dog Hero Awards, the channel started a franchise out of the show with additional shows that counter programming major sporting events. Beyond the Dog Hero Awards and the Kitten Bowl, the channel has Paw-Star Game, on during MLB's All-Star Game, and Summer Kitten Games countering in its first showing the  Rio Olympics. On February 2, 2014, the Hallmark Channel partnered with New York's North Shore Animal League and Last Hope Animal Rescue to debut the Kitten Bowl during Super Bowl XLVIII.  The event – hosted by Beth Stern and announcers John Sterling and Mary Carillo – is designed as counterprogramming to the Super Bowl and airs during the game's halftime show, and is similar to another animal-themed event that debuted nine years earlier on Animal Planet, the Puppy Bowl. Kitten Bowl II returned on February 1, 2015, and was watched by 1.3 million viewers. A new Kitten Bowl has aired every year since, running repeatedly on Super Bowl Sunday in a three-hour program that includes "playoff games". In 2019 Hallmark added Cat Bowl, which premiered on Super Bowl weekend. The eighth and last edition of the Kitten Bowl aired in 2021, as Hallmark canceled it in 2022.

Content standards 
The Hallmark Channel has been criticized for editing its programming to remove what its Standards and Practices department considers offensive words. After the word "God" was muted in April 2014 from the film It Could Happen to You, in what is described as an attempt "to avoid taking His name in vain", the practice backfired when viewers interpreted the muting as evidence of hatred for God. Blogger Donna Cavanagh criticized the channel's content policies in July 2011, describing them as "censorship at its worst", with removal of profanities or epithets such as "ass" and "hooker". In response to Cavanagh's inquiry, a representative of the network wrote:

Cavanagh accused the network of hypocrisy in deeming such material as being objectionable according to the network's standards, while continuing to acquire off-network sitcoms such as Frasier and The Golden Girls, which often feature sexual content including references to promiscuity. Others have recommended the channel's late night programming, while noting that the word removal from these programs "puts a mild damper on the fun."

International versions

Hallmark Channel operated several cable channels in various international markets; they were sold in 2005 to Sparrowhawk Media, which was in turn acquired by Universal Networks International in 2007.

Universal's licensing agreement ended in July 2011; the networks were either shut down, or rebranded under another NBC Universal-owned brand (such as Diva Universal, Studio Universal, 13th Street Universal or Universal Channel). In the United Kingdom, the Hallmark Original Movies originally shown on the channel are now shown on Movies 24, a sister to the Hallmark Channel.

On October 25, 2018, Corus Entertainment announced that W Network would become the exclusive Canadian broadcaster of Hallmark Channel original series and films beginning November 1. The agreement includes branded blocks of Hallmark Channel programming, and airings of seasonal events such as Countdown to Christmas (which launched the agreement).

See also
 List of Hallmark Hall of Fame episodes

References

External links
 

 
Studio City, Los Angeles
Television networks in the United States
English-language television stations in the United States
Television channels and stations established in 1984
1984 establishments in the United States